YapBrowser, also known as YapSearch or YapCash, is a rogue Web browser that was removed from the Internet after security researchers found it was serving up child porn advertising. It eventually reappeared [1], with a peculiar twist; it now came with the odd claim that users could expect protection from harmful exploits and viruses.

The site hosting the browser download originates from Russia and includes an "adult version" that lets users search for and browse pornography-themed content for free.

The site even offers a "100% guarantee" that no malicious system infection will occur when using the software, but security researchers tracking the seedier side of the Internet have flagged YapBrowser as a serious threat to computer users.

The first sign of YapBrowser trouble came in April 2006 when malware researchers discovered that the browser was serving up spyware and underage porn advertising.

McAfee flags YapBrowser as a "potentially unwanted program" that directs the user to use the yapsearch.com search portal.
It appears that YapBrowser is primarily a front-end for an Internet Explorer HTML rendering engine that uses commercial links to push users to other shopping search portals.

In June 2006 YapBrowser was acquired by Search engine MyAllSearch.com.

External links
 YapBrowser Homepage
 SearchWebMe Press Release
 Yapbrowser: serves up Zango and...child porn?
 Return of Porn-Fetching 'YapBrowser' Raises Eyebrows
 YapBrowser- SpywareGuide
 Users Warned After YapBrowser Returns From the Dead - PC World

References
  https://www.theregister.co.uk/2011/10/10/yapbrowser_zombie_reanimates/

Spyware